The 2022–23 Michigan Wolverines men's hockey team is the Wolverines' 101st season of play. They represent the University of Michigan in the 2022–23 NCAA Division I men's ice hockey season. They are coached by Brandon Naurato, in his first year as interim head coach, and play their home games at Yost Ice Arena.

Previous season
During the 2021–22 season, Michigan went 31–10–1, including 16–8–0 in Big Ten play. They won the 2022 Big Ten Men's Ice Hockey Tournament and received an automatic bid to the 2022 NCAA Division I Men's Ice Hockey Tournament, where they reached their NCAA record 26th Frozen Four and were eliminated in the semifinals by eventual national champion Denver.

Departures

Recruiting

Roster
As of August 22, 2022.

Coaching staff

Standings

Schedule and results

|-
!colspan=12 style=";" | Exhibition

|-
!colspan=12 style=";" | Regular Season

|-
!colspan=12 style=";" | 

|-
!colspan=12 style=";" |

Rankings

^ USCHO did not release a poll in weeks 1 and 13.

Awards and honors

Players drafted into the NHL
Michigan had three players drafted in the 2022 NHL Entry Draft. Frank Nazar and Rutger McGroarty were selected back-to-back in the first round of the NHL Draft.

References

External links
 Official Website

2022–23
Michigan
Michigan
Michigan ice hockey
Michigan ice hockey